Sheikh Sahidul Islam Politician of Bagerhat District of Bangladesh And elected a member of parliament from Bagerhat-2.

Career 
Sahidul was elected to parliament from Bagerhat-2 as a Jatiya Party In 1988 Bangladeshi general election.

References 

Possibly living people
Year of birth missing (living people)
People from Bagerhat District
Jatiya Party politicians
4th Jatiya Sangsad members
Year of birth missing